Grevillea beardiana, commonly known as red combs, is a species of flowering plant in the family Proteaceae and is endemic to the south-west of Western Australia. It is a shrub with linear to narrowly wedge-shaped leaves and bright red or orange flowers.

Description
The edges of the leaves are rolled under.

Taxonomy
Grevillea beardiana was first formally described in 1986 by Donald McGillivray in his book New Names in Grevillea (Proteaceae), based on specimens collected in 1962 by John Stanley Beard near Newdegate. The specific epithet (beardiana) honours the collector of  the type specimens.

Distribution and habitat
Red combs grows in heathland in sandy and granitic soils, and occurs between Newdegate, Salmon Gums and Lake Johnston in the Coolgardie, Esperance Plains and Mallee biogeographic regions of south-western Western Australia.

Conservation status
Grevillea beadleana is listed as "not threatened" by the Government of Western Australia Department of Biodiversity, Conservation and Attractions.

References

beardiana
Proteales of Australia
Flora of Western Australia
Taxa named by Donald McGillivray
Plants described in 1986